The Christian Evangelical Church in Sangihe-Talaud was organised in 15 May 1947. In the late 1800s the Netherlands Missionary Society started working in Sulawesi. It has several had hardships, but gained independence and the Synod was formed in 1947. The church has a large number of elementary and vacational schools and clinics. Today 90% of the inhabitants in Sangihe-Talaud belong to this denomination. The church is a member of the World Communion of Reformed Churches. The church has 220,000 members and 355 congregations and has a presbyterian-synodal government.

References 

1947 establishments in the Dutch East Indies
Calvinist denominations established in the 20th century
Evangelical denominations in Asia
Members of the World Communion of Reformed Churches
Reformed denominations in Indonesia
Christian organizations established in 1947